Anthony John Herbert Carter (17 December 1881 – 1970) was an English professional footballer who played as a full back.

Career
Carter played for Sunderland, Bradford City and Carlisle United. For Bradford City, he made 30 appearances in the Football League; he also made 9 FA Cup appearances.

Sources

References

1881 births
1970 deaths
Date of death missing
English footballers
Sunderland A.F.C. players
Bradford City A.F.C. players
Carlisle United F.C. players
English Football League players
Association football fullbacks